Group captain Walter Myers Churchill,  (24 November 1907 – 27 August 1942) was a Royal Air Force pilot and flying ace during World War II.

Churchill was the elder brother of Peter Churchill and Oliver Churchill, both of whom were Special Operations Executive officers during the Second World War.

Early life
Churchill was born in Amsterdam, Netherlands, on 24 November 1907 to William Algernon Churchill, a British diplomat, and singer Violet Churchill (née Myers). William served as a British consul in Mozambique and Pará in Brazil prior to Walter's birth, and in Amsterdam, Stockholm, Milan, Palermo, and Algiers in Walter's youth. William was also an art connoisseur, and author of what is still the standard reference work on early European paper and papermaking, Watermarks in Paper.

Churchill was named after his uncle Walter Myers, an eminent physician and bacteriologist who died in 1901 aged 28. He was educated at Sedbergh School, and in 1926 read Modern Languages at King's College, Cambridge. He then became an aeronautical engineer with Armstrong Siddeley Motors, Coventry, after which he started an aviation precision engineering company, Churchill Components (Coventry) Ltd, in 1937, which supplied machined parts such as exhaust valves for radial aero-engines to Armstrong Siddeley. After being blitzed out of Coventry in 1941, the company re-located to Market Bosworth. The company worked for Sir Frank Whittle, the jet-engine pioneer, and it machined compressor blades for the gas-turbine engines in the early 1940s.

Royal Air Force
Churchill was commissioned as a pilot officer in the Auxiliary Air Force on 11 January 1932 and appointed to No. 605 (County of Warwick) Squadron. He was promoted to flight lieutenant in June 1937 and transferred from the AAF to the Auxiliary Air Force Reserve of Officers in January 1939. He was recalled to No. 605 Squadron and full-time service in August 1939, and commanded the squadron from June to September 1940, when he was succeeded by Archie McKellar. Churchill later served with No. 3 Squadron and No. 71 (Eagle) Squadron and took part in the Battle of Britain as a squadron leader. On 11 September 1940 his Hurricane was badly damaged in combat over Maidstone but he was able to land at Croydon, slightly wounded. 

During his tenure as Squadron Commander with 71 (Eagle) at RAF Debden, he instructed his pilots to land the outdated Brewster Buffaloes with their tail wheels unlocked, causing damage to the aircraft after which Hurricanes were issued to the squadron.

Churchill was an 'ace' pilot credited with seven "kills", and was awarded a Distinguished Service Order and a Distinguished Flying Cross.

He also evaluated various makes of fighter aircraft for the RAF and played a key role in getting Spitfire aircraft to the defence of Malta. In August 1942, he was posted to command RAF Ta Kali in Malta as group captain. He planned the first attacks Sicily and led the first raid on 23 August. Four days later, leading a raid on Biscari airfield near Gela in southern Sicily he was killed when his Spitfire was hit by flak and crashed in flames. He was buried at the Syracuse War Cemetery.

Extract of letter from Air Vice Marshal Keith Park, Air Officer Commanding, RAF Mediterranean to his widow:

The company continued under the management of his wife, Joyce, and subsequently that of his second son, James. The company is now known as JJ Churchill Ltd. and is managed by James's son, Andrew.

Honours and awards
 31 May 1940: Flight Lieutenant Walter Myers Churchill is awarded the Distinguished Flying Cross:

 31 May 1940: Flight Lieutenant Walter Myers Churchill DFC (90241) is appointed a Companion of the Distinguished Service Order:

References

Bibliography
 Cull, Brian. Spitfires over Malta – The Epic Air Battles of 1942. London: Grub Street, 2005. .

External links
 Battle of Britain Fighter Command Order of Battle
 RAF Station Commanders
 The Battle of Britain London Monument

1907 births
1942 deaths
Military personnel from Amsterdam
Royal Air Force group captains
The Few
British aviators
Companions of the Distinguished Service Order
Recipients of the Distinguished Flying Cross (United Kingdom)
People educated at Sedbergh School
Royal Air Force pilots of World War II
Eagle Squadrons
Royal Air Force personnel killed in World War II
Burials at Syracuse Commonwealth War Graves Commission Cemetery
British expatriates in the Netherlands
British expatriates in Italy
British expatriates in Algeria